Fahad Hadl Al-Shammeri (born 17 October 1988) is a Saudi Arabian professional footballer who plays as a forward for Al-Jubail.

Career
Fahad Hadl started his career at the youth team of Al-Qaisumah and represented the club at every level. On 23 July 2019, Fahad Hadl joined Al-Batin. Fahad Hadl achieved promotion with Al-Batin to the Pro League.

Honours
Al-Qaisumah
Second Division: 2015–16

Al-Batin
MS League: 2019–20

References

External links
 

1988 births
Living people
Saudi Arabian footballers
Association football forwards
Al-Qaisumah FC players
Al Batin FC players
Al-Jubail Club players
Saudi Fourth Division players
Saudi Third Division players
Saudi Second Division players
Saudi First Division League players
Saudi Professional League players